Frédéric Guilbert (born 24 December 1994) is a French professional footballer who plays as a right back for Ligue 1 club Strasbourg. A product of the Caen youth system, he has played mainly in France for AS Cherbourg, Bordeaux and Strasbourg, as well as a spell with English side Aston Villa. He has a single cap for the France U21 side.

Club career

Bordeaux
Guilbert joined Bordeaux in 2014 from Cherbourg. He made his Ligue 1 debut on 5 April 2015 in a 2–1 home win against Lens replacing Thomas Touré after 79 minutes.

SM Caen
On 28 July 2017, Guilbert transferred to Caen after completing a loan spell during the 2016–17 season.

Guilbert was known for being a proficient and hard tackler with an average of 3.1 clearances and 2.9 tackles per game respectively throughout his final season with the club. He finished his time with Caen having amassed 106 appearances over three seasons.

Aston Villa
On 31 January 2019, Guilbert signed for Aston Villa for an undisclosed fee, but would remain at Caen on loan until the end of the season. He scored his first goal for Villa in an EFL Cup tie against Crewe Alexandra on 27 August 2019. He would go onto score his second goal for Aston Villa in the EFL Cup semi-final match against Leicester City on 8 January 2020.

Strasbourg (loan)
On 31 January 2021, Guilbert signed for Ligue 1 side Strasbourg on loan for the rest of the season. Guilbert made his Strasbourg debut on 10 February 2021 in a 2–0 home defeat to Montpellier in the Coupe de France. On 3 March 2021, Guilbert scored his first goal for Strasbourg, a late winner in a 1–0 home victory over Monaco in Ligue 1. After returning to Villa from his loan spell for pre-season, on 31 August 2021, Guilbert returned to Strasbourg on loan for the 2021–22 season.

Guilbert stayed at Villa following the summer transfer window of 2022. In September 2022, Aston Villa submitted their 25-player Premier League squad for the 2022–23 season, including Guilbert, despite rumours in a local newspaper that he had been instructed to train with the Under-21s rather than the senior squad.

Strasbourg 
On 17 January 2023, after not having made a senior competitive appearance for Aston Villa since August 2021, Guilbert signed for Strasbourg on a permanent transfer for an undisclosed fee. Guilbert himself stated that it was a free transfer, with his Villa contract being terminated by mutual consent.

Career statistics

Honours
Aston Villa
EFL Cup runner-up: 2019–20

References

External links

 
 

1994 births
Living people
Sportspeople from Manche
Association football defenders
French footballers
France under-21 international footballers
Ligue 1 players
Championnat National 2 players
Premier League players
AS Cherbourg Football players
FC Girondins de Bordeaux players
Stade Malherbe Caen players
Aston Villa F.C. players
RC Strasbourg Alsace players
French expatriate footballers
Expatriate footballers in England
French expatriate sportspeople in England
Footballers from Normandy